Pierre Hermé (born 20 November 1961) is a French pastry chef and chocolatier. He began his career at the age of 14 as an apprentice to Gaston Lenôtre. Hermé was awarded the title of World's Best Pastry Chef in 2016 by The World's 50 Best Restaurants. He was also ranked the fourth most influential French person in the world by Vanity Fair. Hermé created his own brand in 1998 with Charles Znaty.

Life and career

Heir to four generations of Alsatian bakery and pastry-making tradition, Pierre Hermé arrived in Paris at the age of 14 to start his first apprenticeship with Gaston Lenôtre, called by Vogue "the Picasso of Pastry" and who revolutionized pastry-making with regard to taste and modernity.

He created the Maison Pierre Hermé Paris in 1998 with his associate Charles Znaty. The first Pierre Hermé Paris boutique opened in Tokyo in 1998, followed in 2001 by a boutique in Paris, located in the fashion district of Saint-Germain-des-Prés at 72 rue Bonaparte. Success was immediate in Tokyo and Paris alike. Every day, enthusiastic gourmets discovered Pierre Hermé pastries, macarons and chocolates while connaisseures from around the world flocked to these temples of sweet delights. In late 2004, a second Parisian boutique with its very innovative interior design opened at 185 rue de Vaugirard. In early 2005, Tokyo saw the inauguration of the latest Pierre Hermé Paris concepts: the Luxury Convenience Store and the Chocolate Bar. Both establishments are situated in the Omotesando district, where all of the major imported brands and fashion houses active in Japan are also present. In 2008, Pierre Hermé and Charles Znaty launched the first Macarons & Chocolats Pierre Hermé Paris boutique on rue Cambon in Paris. In 2010, they inaugurated the Maison Pierre Hermé on rue Fortuny in Paris, home to the Atelier de Création. The brand is a member of the Comité Colbert and has an established partnership with the Raffles group and Ritz Carlton group and Dior since the opening of the Café Dior by Pierre Hermé in 2015 in Seoul.

The company has been expanding strongly since 2010 on the international scene with several boutiques located in Europe, Asia and the Middle East. Since 2012, his desserts have been served on All Nippon Airways.

Creative Style & Praise 

Preferring discreet pastry decors and "uses sugar like salt, in other words, as a seasoning to heighten other shades of flavour" and refusing to sit on his laurels, he is always revising his own work, exploring new taste territories and revisiting his own recipes. As a result, praise has often been lavished on Pierre Hermé, who has been called "pastry provocateur" (Food & Wine), "an avant-garde pastry chef and a magician with tastes" (Paris-Match), "The Kitchen Emperor" (New York Times) and "The King of Modern Patisserie" (The Guardian), along with honours and decorations, as well as – most importantly – the admiring gratitude of connoisseurs of gourmet sweets.

Hermé was the youngest person to be named France's Pastry Chef of the Year, and is the only pastry chef to have been decorated as a Chevalier of Arts and Letters. He was awarded Chevalier de la Légion d'honneur by Jacques Chirac in May 2007.

Books

 Pierre Hermé, Secrets Gourmands, Larousse, 1993
 La Pâtisserie de Pierre Hermé, Montagud Editores, Espagne, 1994
 Coauteur Larousse Gastronomique, 1996
 Le Larousse des Desserts de Pierre Hermé, Larousse, 1997
 Plaisirs Sucrés, Hachette, 1997
 Desserts by Pierre Hermé, Little Brown, USA, 1998
 Pierre Hermé, Secrets Gourmands, Shibata Shoten, Japon, 1999
 Desserts à la carte, Hachette, 2000
 Pierre Hermé, Secrets Gourmands, Noésis, 2000
 La Pâtisserie de Pierre Hermé, Edizioni Finedit, Italie, 2001
 Chocolate Desserts by Pierre Hermé, Little Brown, USA, 2001
 Le Larousse des Desserts, Larousse, 2002
 Plaisirs Sucrés (réédition), Hachette, octobre 2002
 Mes Desserts au Chocolat, Agnès Viénot Éditions, octobre 2002
 Mes Desserts Préférés, Agnès Viénot Éditions, octobre 2003
 Die Pâtisserie Von Pierre Hermé, Mathaes, Allemagne, 2004
 Le Larousse du Chocolat, Éditions Larousse, octobre 2005
 "The Cooks Book", Dorling Kindersley, UK, octobre 2005
 PH10, Agnès Vienot Éditions, octobre 2005. Vainqueur des Gourmand World Cookbook Awards
 Gourmandises, Agnès Vienot Éditions, octobre 2006
 Coauteur Comme un chef, Éditions Larousse, octobre 2006
 Gourmandises, Agnès Viénot, Éditions, 2006
 Le Larousse des desserts, Larousse, 2006
 Confidences Sucrées, Agnès Viénot Éditions, 2007
 Macaron, Agnès Viénot Édition, 2008
 Le Larousse des Desserts, Dohosha Media Plan, 2008
 Le livre des Fours secs et moelleux de Pierre Hermé, Asahiya Shuppan, 2009
 Carrément Chocolat, Agnès Viénot Édition, 2009
 Infiniment, Agnès Viénot Édition, 2010
 Le Livre Chocolat de Pierre Hermé, Asahiya Shuppan, 2010
 Rêves de pâtissier : 50 classiques de la pâtisserie réinventés, Éditions de la Martinière, octobre 2011
 Best of Pierre Hermé, Alain Ducasse Édition, novembre 2011
 Macarons, Grub Street Publishing, United Kingdom, 2011
 Le Livre des Viennoiseries de Pierre Hermé, Asahiya Shuppan, 2011
 Au Cœur du Goût, coauteurs : Jean-Michel Duriez, Agnès Viénot Editions, 2012
 Le Chocolat Apprivoisé, PHP Editions, 2013
 Ispahan, Edition de la Martinière, 2013
 Pierre Hermé et moi (Illustré par Soledad Bravi), Édition Marabout, Avril 2014
 Macaron, Éditions de la Martinière, Octobre 2014
 Satine, Editions Grund, 2015
 Chocolat, Pierre Hermé & Sergio Coimbra, Flammarion 2016

References

External links

Official website
Pierre Herme Article
Cannes Dessert Prize Hall of Fame

1961 births
French chefs
Pastry chefs
People from Colmar
Living people
Commandeurs of the Ordre des Arts et des Lettres